The Diamond Mountain District AVA is an American Viticultural Area located in California's Mayacamas Mountains in the northwest portion of the Napa Valley AVA. The appellation sits at a higher elevation than most of Napa Valley's wine region, resulting in less cool fog coming in from San Pablo Bay, and more direct exposure to sunlight. 
The soil of this AVA is volcanic and very porous which allows it to cool down quickly despite the increased sunlight.

Geography and climate

The soil of the Diamond Mountain District is volcanic, including the small bits of volcanic glass that give the area its name.

The AVA is defined by the Napa-Sonoma county line on the west, Petrified Forest Road on the north, the 400 foot line of altitude running parallel to Route 29 on the east, and the Spring Mountain District to the south.  This puts the southern part of the  city of Calistoga, California in the appellation, with the northern part being in the Calistoga AVA since 2010.

History
Diamond Mountain District's history as a winegrowing region dates back to 1868, when the first vines were planted by Jacob Schram on a tract of land he purchased on the Napa side of the mountain. By 1892, his holdings had expanded to 100 acres, including underground cellars for aging and storing wine. His name has continued in the property, now known as Schramsberg Vineyards

Controversy
When the AVA was proposed in 1999, a request for public comments was published in the Federal Register. One winery, Diamond Mountain Vineyards, objected to the western border ending on the Napa-Sonoma county line, as it would split their property in half. Their objections extended the public comment period by several months. Ultimately, the decision was to keep the boundary on the Napa-Sonoma line.

Additionally, as originally proposed, the AVA would have been called the "Diamond Mountain AVA," but since the bulk of Diamond Mountain, and indeed, its peak, are in Sonoma County, the AVA was renamed.

References

External links

American Viticultural Areas of the San Francisco Bay Area
Geography of Napa County, California
American Viticultural Areas
2001 establishments in California